"Aprite le finestre" ("Open the windows") is an Italian song  by Franca Raimondi. It won the sixth edition of the Sanremo Music Festival and subsequently was the first  entry in the Eurovision Song Contest 1956 (contest rules allowing two entries per country at this contest only).

Background 
The song is in the Tuscan  style, with Raimondi singing about the joy of Spring (described as "a festival of love") beginning and her desire to open the windows to let the new season in.

At Eurovision 
The song was performed seventh on the night, following 's Michèle Arnaud with "Ne crois pas" and preceding the ' Corry Brokken with "Voorgoed voorbij". Points and final placings at this Contest have never been revealed, meaning that the only statement which can be made about the song's final position was that it did not win.

The song was accompanied at the 1956 contest by Tonina Torrielli with "Amami se vuoi" and was succeeded as Italian representative at the 1957 contest by Nunzio Gallo with "Corde della mia chitarra".

Charts

Cover versions 
Artists who recorded cover versions of the song include Nilla Pizzi, Quartetto Cetra and Achille Togliani.

References

Eurovision songs of Italy
Eurovision songs of 1956
Italian-language songs
Sanremo Music Festival songs
1956 songs